The Rio Bonito Formation is a geological formation of the Paraná and Pelotas Basins of Permian age. It is represented by a succession of cyclic sedimentary packages of sandstones, siltstones and shales which bear extensive deposits of coal that has been extracted since the 19th century. The Rio Bonito Formation was deposited in a coastal environment, formed by rivers, deltas, bays and estuaries with tidal plains, barrier islands and shallow marine platform, at a time when the Paraná Basin was a large gulf of the ancient supercontinent Gondwana. This gulf was open to the southwest, to the old ocean Panthalassa. The Rio Bonito Formation outcrops occur mainly in the eastern border of the Paraná Basin, in a narrow band in the states of São Paulo, Paraná, Santa Catarina, Rio Grande do Sul and Uruguay. The Rio Bonito Formation belongs to the second-order stratigraphic supersequence called Gondwana I.

Glossopteris flora 
The Glossopteris flora is characteristic of fossil sequences of the Gondwana supercontinent; it developed and became the dominant flora of the southern Permian to early Triassic, and became extinct at the end of that period. This flora is not only the main fossil content of the Rio Bonito Formation coals, the coal extracted as in Australia and South Africa's first work to record the occurrence of horizons megaflora associated with coal seams within a paleogeographic approach and palaeoclimatic in the Paraná Basin, was the study by White in 1908. This allowed a large correlation between Gondwana coal deposits in southern Brazil and those registered in South Africa, Australia, India and Antarctica, including showing that the latter has been in latitude near the south pole less than today, allowing the occurrence of an extensive flora.

Fossil content 
Among others, the following fossil flora have been recovered from the formation:

 Araucarites
 Asterotheca
 Cordaites
 Coricladus
 Glossopteris
 Pecopteris
 Phyllotheca
 Samaropsis
 Sphenopteris
 Voltzia

References 

Geologic formations of Brazil
Geologic formations of Uruguay
Permian System of South America
Permian Brazil
Permian Uruguay
Artinskian Stage
Sakmarian
Sandstone formations
Formations
Permian southern paleotemperate deposits
Fossiliferous stratigraphic units of South America
Paleontology in Brazil
Geography of Rio Grande do Sul
Geography of São Paulo (state)